"Totes Fleisch" is a song composed by the rock band Terminal Choice,  from their 1995 mini-album with the self title.

Review
It was the band's first single it was published from Cyberware Productions and was limited of 1000 copies. In January 1998 released Terminal Choice a CD with remix versions from his song, it was limited of 666 copies hand numbered, from the 1998 overworked was the genre dance and is as a Megamix produced.

Track list
 Höllensog (7:32)
 Serial Killer (5:00)
 Totes Fleisch (5:44)
 Time To Die (2:40)

Covers
In 1999 released Chris Pohl of the Terminal Choice EP Venus an Blutengel Remix, 2008 covered Chris Pohl his song with his new project Miss Construction, the song begins with silver screen quotations from Kill Bill.

Credits
Lyrics and Music by  Chris Pohl
Recorded and Mixed by – Heiko Bender

Recorded and mixed at Studio am Kleistpark.

References

External links
 Discogs

1995 singles
German rock songs
1995 songs